Spymaster is a fictional supervillain appearing in American comic books published by Marvel Comics.

Publication history

Spymaster is a supervillain and recurring foe to Iron Man. He is a master of industrial espionage. His identity has changed several times over the years.

The first appearance of the character is in Iron Man #33 (Jan 1971), and he was created by Allyn Brodsky, Don Heck, and Stan Lee.

Fictional character biography

Original Spymaster
The original Spymaster was a costumed freelance industrial spy, saboteur, and assassin with advanced weaponry. He was a master of espionage, and died without revealing his true identity, although it is known that he was once a boxer. He and his team of assistants, the Espionage Elite, were hired by the criminal organization the Zodiac to infiltrate Stark Industries and steal all of company owner and genius inventor Tony Stark's secrets. His efforts were stopped by Stark's alter-ego, the armored superhero Iron Man. However, he was assigned by the Zodiac to capture Daredevil but failed at that as well. Spymaster aided Aquarius, Capricorn, and Sagittarius in an attempt to steal the Zodiac Key from Stark. The Spymaster was transported to the other-dimensional realm of the Brotherhood of the Ankh, but returned to Earth and escaped. Spymaster was assigned by renegade S.H.I.E.L.D. agents to assassinate Tony Stark, but failed. He was employed by Madame Masque to steal a prototype energizer link, and abducted Bethany Cabe.

Spymaster came into conflict with Iron Man several more times, and on one occasion with the masked hero Daredevil. At one point Spymaster apparently succeeded in assassinating Tony Stark, but in reality it was a Life Model Decoy. He also succeeded in stealing many of Stark's Iron Man designs, giving them over to Stark's rival Justin Hammer, sparking the Armor Wars event. Stark believes that Spymaster may have found out his secret identity, but that Spymaster kept it to himself.

The first Spymaster last appeared after coming into conflict with fellow Iron Man villain the Ghost, who has technology enabling him to become intangible. After Spymaster attempted to assassinate the Ghost in Los Angeles under orders from Roxxon, Iron Man arrived, causing the two villains to attempt an escape. The Ghost offered Spymaster one of his intangibility devices, and Spymaster used the device to pass through a wall. The Ghost removed the device from Spymaster's chest while he was still phasing halfway through a wall, causing him to rematerialize partially inside the wall and killing him instantly.

During the Dark Reign storyline, it is revealed that he actually faked his own death and has been living in deep cover ever since until he is found by Norman Osborn. Spymaster is hired to steal a treasured photograph of Tony Stark's parents, which Norman Osborn then burns.

During the Infinity storyline, Spymaster recruits Blizzard II, Constrictor, Firebrand IV, Unicorn I, Whiplash IV, and Whirlwind to help him in a plot to attack the almost-defenseless Stark Tower while the Avengers were away from Earth fighting the Builders. In the same issue, Spymaster apparently runs the Black Market Club (a nightclub for supervillains).

Nathan Lemon
The second Spymaster was an accomplished student of the Taskmaster who won the right to the name in a series of tests including a final test of killing all other contenders in a battleground simulator, with all contestants blindfolded. This new Spymaster was appointed by the Taskmaster for Justin Hammer, and battled Iron Man in his first appearance. This iteration had one of his own Espionage Elite bug Tony Stark's office, and overheard Stark and his secretary Pepper Potts talking about Stark's double identity. Acting under orders from the Mandarin, his Elite ambushed and beat Stark severely, until the Black Widow intervened. In 2007, Spymaster II, who has had no known identity, was retroactively named Nathan Lemon due to a series' 'flashback' episode in which Stark delves into his mind and figures out his name. Sinclair Abbot, the third Spymaster, claimed he had Lemon killed in prison.

Sinclair Abbot
Sinclair Abbot, a wealthy industrialist, is the latest person to hold the Spymaster mantle. He achieved this by having the previous one arrested, severely beaten in jail, and then killed in intensive care by his wife. His debut was in the miniseries Iron Man: The Inevitable. He has yet to attempt any direct action against Iron Man, choosing to send Ghost against him, and playing mind-games with Stark at public events, subtly jabbing him about his alcoholism and former military contracts. Abbot feels that to be a true supervillain, he needs to prove his mettle against Iron Man, while at the same time, to humble Iron Man; it has been an extended period of time since Iron Man has fought a "supervillain" in the classical sense, and Abbot resents the apparent indication that Iron Man is "too good" for supervillains, as if he is above that station.

With the Civil War causing Tony Stark considerable problems, the Spymaster was hired by Karim Wahwash Najeeb (chairman of the World Islamic Peace Coalition and one of the men responsible for the death of Stark's mentor Ho Yinsen) to kill Iron Man. Spymaster killed Tony Stark's chauffeur and attempted to use Happy Hogan as live bait to draw Iron Man, but Hogan managed to attack him and both fell several stories to the ground, which led to the death of Hogan, one of Tony's oldest and dearest friends.

Spymaster later resurfaced where he has a bomb planted in him by Mandarin and Zeke Stane as they force him to assist other villains in attacking Iron Man.

After being defeated and rendered powerless during an attempted assault on Stark Resilient (deprived of his suit and weaponry while awaiting transfer to a Supermax prison), he apparently commits "Suicide by cop" and is shot multiple times by the policemen guarding him.

Powers and abilities
Each Spymaster has no superhuman abilities. However, each is an exceptional fighter and strategist. The first Spymaster was an excellent hand-to-hand combatant, with formal training in boxing and various martial arts. The second Spymaster is also an excellent hand-to-hand combatant, having been trained at the Taskmaster's Academy. Each is also an extraordinary industrial spy and saboteur, master of disguise, a superb actor, a highly agile and skilled athlete, and greatly skilled in the uses of virtually any kind of gun. Spymaster always has access to cutting-edge technology for a number of espionage-related devices and weapons, both of his own design and those of Justin Hammer's. The original Spymaster used various special devices including, devices in his gloves and mask that projected concussive energy blasts, small and powerful hovering electromagnets, incendiary missiles, "razor-discs" that could pierce Iron Man's armor, devices that enabled him to absorb Iron Man's repulsor energy, stunguns, sleep inducing "somnu-gas", boot jets that allowed flight, and a device in his belt buckle that summoned an advanced model hovercraft that could operate automatically according to pre-programmed instructions. Both the first and second Spymasters have employed electronically amplified nun-chakas that can damage Iron Man's armor. The Spymaster wears a battlesuit of bulletproof Kevlar body armor which provides some protection from physical attacks, and contains various pockets for holding weaponry.

In other media

Television
 Spymaster appears in The Incredible Hulk episode "Prisoner of the Monster". This version is an overweight man with black hair and a white suit.

References

External links
 Spymaster I at Marvel.com
 Spymaster II at Marvel.com
 Spymaster III at Marvel.com

Comics characters introduced in 1971
Comics characters introduced in 2007
Characters created by Don Heck
Characters created by Stan Lee
Fictional boxers
Fictional businesspeople
Fictional secret agents and spies
Marvel Comics martial artists
Marvel Comics supervillains